Jay Jason Stacy (born 9 August 1968 in Melbourne, Victoria) is a former field hockey midfielder from Australia, who participated in four Summer Olympics for his native country, starting in 1988.

References
 Hockey Australia

External links
 

1968 births
Australian male field hockey players
Male field hockey midfielders
Australian field hockey coaches
Olympic field hockey players of Australia
Field hockey players at the 1988 Summer Olympics
Field hockey players at the 1992 Summer Olympics
Field hockey players at the 1996 Summer Olympics
1998 Men's Hockey World Cup players
Field hockey players at the 2000 Summer Olympics
Field hockey players from Melbourne
Living people
Olympic silver medalists for Australia
Olympic bronze medalists for Australia
Olympic medalists in field hockey
Medalists at the 2000 Summer Olympics
Medalists at the 1996 Summer Olympics
Medalists at the 1992 Summer Olympics
Commonwealth Games medallists in field hockey
Commonwealth Games gold medallists for Australia
Oranje Zwart players
Expatriate field hockey players
Australian expatriate sportspeople in the Netherlands
Field hockey players at the 1998 Commonwealth Games
1990 Men's Hockey World Cup players
20th-century Australian people
Medallists at the 1998 Commonwealth Games